Triumph and Agony is the fourth and final studio album by the German heavy metal band Warlock, released on 29 September 1987.

The album was recorded in the US with producer Joey Balin and a different band line-up in comparison with the previous album True as Steel, which had made the name of Warlock known outside of Europe. Peter Szigeti and Frank Rittel were replaced in 1987 by the American musicians Tommy Bolan and Tommy Henriksen respectively. The album also features British drummer Cozy Powell on some tracks.

The song "All We Are" received some airplay on American metal radio stations and its video clip shot by director Mark Rezyka had good rotation on MTV's Headbangers Ball. Many songs of this album are still performed live by Doro's band.

Track listing

Personnel

Band members
Doro Pesch – vocals
Niko Arvanitis – guitar
Tommy Bolan – guitar
Tommy Henriksen – bass
Michael Eurich – drums

Additional musicians
Cozy Powell – guest drummer on "Touch of Evil"
Rudy Richman – guest drummer
Sterling Campbell – guest drummer

Production
Joey Balin – producer, arrangements
Brooke Hendricks, Mr. Mitch – mixing
Steve Rinkoff, Larry Alexander – engineers
Roy Hendrickson – assistant engineer
Greg Calbi – mastering at Sterling Sound
Geoffrey Gillespie – illustration
Peter Zimmermann – management

Charts

Sales and certifications

References

1987 albums
Warlock (band) albums
Vertigo Records albums
Mercury Records albums